The men's 1500 metres event at the 2002 Commonwealth Games was held on 30–31 July.

Medalists

Results

Heats
Qualification: First 4 of each heat (Q) and the next 4 fastest (q) qualified for the final.

Final

References
Official results
Results at BBC

1500
2002